Banias River ( Nahr Baniyas;  Nahal Hermon) is a river in the Golan Heights. It is the easternmost of the three main northern tributaries of the Jordan River; together with the Dan River and the Snir Stream, it forms the Jordan River's upper catchment (UCJR). Israel has included the stream in the Hermon nature reserve.

Course and streamflow

The main source of the Banias River is the Banias spring, located at the southern base of the Hermon mountain range and contributing a discharge of 67·million m3 annually. From there the stream flows south for nine kilometers before draining into the Dan River. Along the way, it drains the Guvta Stream (right), the Sa'ar Stream (left), the Pera' Stream (left), and the Sion (Ar.: el-'Asl) Stream (right), with a total drainage area of 158 km2. The total annual streamflow of the river comes to 106 million m3.

Flora and fauna
The banks of the river abound in willow trees, oriental planes, silver-leaf poplars, Tabor oaks, Palestine oaks, Mt. Atlas mastics, terebinths, carobs, ferns, giant canes, and various vines.

The stream is home to a variety of fluvial fish, including longhead barbel, large-scale barbel, Damascus barbel, and tilapia. Living and roaming around the stream or in it are wild boars, Syrian rock hyrax, swamp cats, nutria, and Indian porcupines.

Birds that frequent the vicinity of the stream include rock doves and Western rock nuthatch.

References 

Rivers of Syria
Tributaries of the Jordan River
Hebrew Bible rivers
Geography of the Middle East